Louis Wagner (August 4, 1838 – January 15, 1914) was a German-born American military infantry officer who served in the Union Army and as the 9th Commander-in-Chief of the Grand Army of the Republic, 1880-1881.

Early life and military career
Wagner was born August 4, 1838, in Giessen, Germany.  He moved with his parents to the United States at age 11 and eventually learned the trade of a lithograph printer.

Wagner enlisted in August 1861 with the 88th Pennsylvania Volunteer Infantry during the Civil War and was mustered in September 13, 1861, and commissioned 1st lieutenant of Company D.  He rose to the rank of captain of Company D and was wounded in action at the Second Battle of Bull Run and captured, but paroled and recovered in hospital at Alexandria, Virginia; for his distinguished service during the battle, he was promoted to major of the regiment.

Wagner was wounded in action again at the Battle of Chancellorsville and returned to Philadelphia where he was recovering but deemed unfit for service in the field.  During his recovery, Wagner was promoted to lieutenant colonel, and he volunteered for the command of Camp William Penn, the first United States Army training camp for African American soldiers.  Upon a surgeon's recommendation, Wagner received the command and was detached from his regiment during the entire time that the camp was in operation.

Wagner was eventually promoted colonel and served as commander of the 5th Brigade, Pennsylvania National Guard until the war's end.

For meritorious service during the war, Wagner received a promotion to brevet brigadier general of U.S. Volunteers, March 13, 1865.

Post-war service
After the war, Wagner served as commissioner of public works for Philadelphia and was very active in the Grand Army of the Republic, both at the local, state, and national levels.

Wagner was a charter member and first commander of G.A.R. Post #6 in Germantown, November 13, 1866.  The following year he was elected Commander of the Pennsylvania Department and both Junior Vice-Commander and Commander-in-Chief in 1870.  He served as Senior Vice-Commander-in-Chief, 1871-1872.  Wagner was elected 9th Commander-in-Chief of the G.A.R. in 1880 at the national encampment in Dayton, Ohio.

During his membership with the G.A.R., from 1868 to 1913, he only missed two national encampments.

Wagner died January 15, 1914, at his home in Germantown and is buried in Ivy Hill Cemetery, Philadelphia.

See also

List of Grand Army of the Republic Commanders-in-Chief

References
 Grand Army of the Republic. Final Journal of the Grand Army of the Republic, 1866-1956 (Washington, DC: U.S. Govt. Print. Off.), 1957.

1838 births
1914 deaths
People of Pennsylvania in the American Civil War
People from Giessen
German emigrants to the United States
Union Army colonels
Grand Army of the Republic Commanders-in-Chief
Burials at Ivy Hill Cemetery (Philadelphia)